The Southern Continent may refer to:

Antarctica, Southernmost Continent.
Australia, see Down Under.
South America, southern part of the Americas.
Africa, from a Eurocentric point of view.
Terra Australis, a large southern continent thought to exist in ancient and medieval times, up through the Age of Discovery